Urquhart is an unincorporated community in Early County, in the U.S. state of Georgia.

History
The community was named after Dr. J. Q. Urquhart, a country physician.

References

Unincorporated communities in Georgia (U.S. state)
Unincorporated communities in Early County, Georgia